Lissonotini is a tribe of beetles in the subfamily Cerambycinae, containing a single genus, Lissonotus, and the following species:

 Lissonotus andalgalensis Bruch, 1908
 Lissonotus biguttatus Dalman in Schoenherr, 1817
 Lissonotus bisignatus Dupont, 1836
 Lissonotus confinis Aurivillius, 1915
 Lissonotus corallinus Dupont, 1836
 Lissonotus cruciatus Dupont, 1836
 Lissonotus ephippiatus Bates, 1870
 Lissonotus equestris Fabricius, 1787
 Lissonotus fallax Bates, 1870
 Lissonotus flabellicornis Germar, 1824
 Lissonotus flavocinctus Dupont, 1836
 Lissonotus kuaiuba Martins & Galileo, 2004
 Lissonotus nigrofasciatus Aurivillius, 1925
 Lissonotus princeps Bates, 1870
 Lissonotus rubidus White, 1853
 Lissonotus rubripes Tippmann, 1960
 Lissonotus rugosus Fuchs, 1958
 Lissonotus simplex Bates, 1870
 Lissonotus spadiceus Dalman, 1823
 Lissonotus unifasciatus Gory in Guérin-Méneville, 1831
 Lissonotus zellibori Tippmann, 1953

References

Cerambycinae
Polyphaga tribes
Monotypic insect tribes